FBNQuest Merchant Bank previously known as Kakawa Discount House is one of the five operational discount houses in Nigeria which serves as government financial tools and acts as a middle access points between all other banks in Nigeria and the Apex bank of Nigeria, the Central Bank of Nigeria. FBN Quest Merchant bank is a subsidiary of First Bank of Nigeria.

As with all discount houses, trade in governments bonds and treasury bills are the primary business functions.

History

Foundation of the discount houses
The Discount Houses sub-sector of the Nigerian financial services industry was birthed in 1995 and came as an offspring of the federal government of Nigeria through the Central bank of Nigeria (CBN). 

Discount Houses became the venue through which banks were able to channel excess liquidity and access same to and from the CBN. A secondary market was created through the discount houses particularly for the trading of Treasury bills and other commercial bills. The name Kakawa came from the street (Kakawa Street) in which the headquarters of their single largest shareholder was located (First Bank of Nigeria).

The shareholders at that time were First Bank of Nigeria Plc, Guaranty Trust Bank Plc, Sterling Bank Plc, First City Monument Bank, Skye Bank, and Unity Bank.

Expansion
Kakawa evolved from being primarily a mono-product institution into being the pioneer for the marketing of Treasury bills to individual investors through the introduction of its proprietary the Treasury Bill Backed Investment (TBBI) product in 1997. In 1998, Corporate Finance was identified and it established an advisory services unit (Wealth Management Unit).

Kakawa Asset Management (KAM) was incorporated in 2004. Prior to its incorporation, KAM had operated as a department of Kakawa since 2001. KAM was primarily established out of the need to provide clients who had worked with Kakawa over time, with longer term investment options in the financial services market. KAM was registered with the Securities and Exchange Commission (Nigeria) (SEC) as a portfolio/fund manager and Investment Adviser.

Acquisition by First Bank Of Nigeria
The remaining shares of Kakawa Discount House were acquired by FBNQuest in 2015, and the company was renamed as FBNQuest Merchant Bank, the brand name of the Merchant Banking and the Asset management businesses of FBN Holdings Plc. It commenced merchant banking operations on 2 November 2015.

References

Financial services companies of Nigeria
Companies based in Lagos